Lohit may refer to:

 Lohit River, in India
 Lohit district, India
 Lohit fonts, a font family covering Indic scripts
 Lohit Diary
 Lohit Express

See also
 Kumkum